The following is a list of football stadiums in Ghana, with a capacity of at least 5,000 Spectators. Some stadiums used for other purposes like Athletics, Concerts, Politics and Cultural Events.

In use

See also 

 List of African stadiums by capacity
 List of stadiums by capacity

References

External links 

 Ghana at WorldStadiums.com

 
Ghana
Football stadiums